Urban Kramar (born 3 October 1990) is a retired Slovenian footballer who played as a winger.

References

External links
PrvaLiga profile 

1990 births
Living people
Sportspeople from Novo Mesto
Slovenian footballers
Association football wingers
Slovenian Second League players
Slovenian PrvaLiga players
NK Krka players